Frederick Thomas Wimble (28 November 1846 – 3 January 1936) was an Australian printer and pioneer ink manufacturer and later a publisher and member of the Legislative Assembly of Queensland representing the Electoral district of Cairns.

Biography

Wimble was born 28 November 1846 at Clerkenwell, London, the thirteenth child (and one of two sons) of Benjamin Wimble and his wife Elizabeth. Benjamin Wimble had pioneered coloured printing ink in England, creating the first supply of red ink to Cambridge University Press.

At 21, Wimble travelled to Austria. Suffering poor health, his doctor then suggested a sea voyage and his father paid for him to travel to Australia. He arrived in Melbourne in July 1867. Wimble wrote to his father suggesting a new market for printers inks in Australia and his father replied by sending fresh supplies and his recipes as well as an ink mill, steam engine and other equipment.

Wimble produced his first ink on 4 May 1868 and in doing do claimed that the Melbourne Star newspaper was the first to have been published in Australia with locally manufactured ink.
The following year he gained contracts in other states by supplying ink for the printing of South Australian postage stamps.

On 13 March 1872 he married Harriett Gascoigne, a widow with two children. They had three more children but were later divorced. There were to be three children of the marriage, which ended in divorce. Between 1876 and 1878 he traveled to the United States of America and Britain in an effort to secure new printing contracts and when he returned to Australia he moved his company to Sydney.

By 1883, Wimble had had enough of the printing business and moved to Queensland hoping to become a "sugar baron". He bought land in the area but soon returned to printing as founder of the Cairns Post. In 1885 he was elected as an alderman to his local council. He reportedly spent £7000 on a campaign to be elected to the Legislative Assembly of Queensland seat of Cairns and was elected on 5 May 1888, beating Richard Kingsford.

On 16 August 1890, during his term in office, he married Marian Sarah Benjamin. They had three children and they remained married until her death in 1933. He served as a member of the Legislative Assembly until 1893 when he stood down and was replaced by future Premier of Queensland, Thomas Joseph Byrnes. He returned to printing and publishing with the production of Wimble's Reminder; as much a catalog as a magazine which ran from 1906 until 1957 (well after his death). In 1924 he published an autobiography, Climbing the Ladder.

Wimble was an active Freemason and a member of the United Grand Lodge of New South Wales.

Wimble died on 3 January 1936 in Artarmon, Sydney.

References

1846 births
1936 deaths
Australian printmakers
Australian newspaper editors
Members of the Queensland Legislative Assembly
Australian Freemasons